Ryan Silvey (born April 17, 1976) is a former Republican member of the Missouri Senate and currently serves on the Missouri Public Service Commission. He represented the 17th district in the Missouri Senate, which includes part of Clay County, from 2013 until his resignation January 4, 2018.

Early life and career
Ryan Silvey was born in Kansas City, Missouri, where he attended Oak Park High School. He later attended Bob Jones University and majored in interpretive speech. He is a member of the Northland Regional Chamber of Commerce. He has a daughter.

Political career
Silvey was a legislative aide to US Senator Kit Bond. He represented the 38th district in the Missouri House of Representatives from 2005 to 2013. He was elected in a special election in 2005 and then reelected in 2006, 2008, and 2010. In 2011, he was made the chairman of the powerful budget committee.

In 2011, Silvey decided to run for the 17th district in the Missouri Senate. It was an open seat because LuAnn Ridgeway was unable to run for re-election due to term limits. Silvey received endorsements from LuAnn Ridgeway, Rob Schaaf, five other current and former Republican representatives, and two Clay County officials. He won the election with 52.8% over Democrat Sandra Reeves.

Silvey resigned from the Missouri Senate on January 4, 2018, and was unanimously confirmed by the Missouri Senate to a position on the Missouri Public Service Commission.

The American Conservative Union gave him an 89% evaluation in 2013 and a 71% evaluation in 2017.

Electoral history

References

External links
 Interest Group Ratings
 Campaign Finance Information
 

Republican Party Missouri state senators
Republican Party members of the Missouri House of Representatives
Living people
Bob Jones University alumni
1976 births
21st-century American politicians